Milacemide (INN) is an MAO-B inhibitor and glycine prodrug. It has been studied for its effects on human memory and as a potential treatment for the symptoms of Alzheimer's disease. Early clinical trials did not show positive results however, and the drug is now abandoned and it is sold as a nonprescription drug or supplement. While milacemide is not an amino-acid, it acts similarly to glycine in the brain.

References

Abandoned drugs
Amino acid derivatives
Monoamine oxidase inhibitors
Glycine receptor agonists
NMDA receptor agonists
Prodrugs